The nasal labial–velar approximant is a type of consonantal sound used in some languages. The equivalent X-SAMPA symbol is w~.

The nasal approximants  and  may also be called nasal glides. In some languages like Portuguese, they form a second element of nasal diphthongs.

Features
Features of the nasal labial–velar approximant:

Occurrence

See also
 Palatal nasal
 Nasal palatal approximant
 Labiodental nasal, which may be an approximant in the one language in which it is phonemic
 Voiceless nasal glottal approximant
 Index of phonetics articles

Notes

References

External links
 

Nasal consonants
Velar consonants
Central consonants
Bilabial consonants
Pulmonic consonants